Scarampi is the name of an old and prominent Ghibelline noble family of Asti and its environs in north-west Italy.

History 
They were bankers of the Casane astigiane first in Genoa and then in France and in Belgium. In 1337 Antonio Scarampi, in exchange for 115,000 florins, became feudatory of Bubbio, Monastero Bormida, Roccaverano, Cortemilia, Perletto, Cairo, Altare and other places of the Langhe. Oddone, Giacomo and Giovannone, three of the five sons of Antonio, each originated their own lineages. Notably, the lineages that are still present nowadays are: Scarampi del Cairo, Scarampi di Villanova and Scarampi di Pruney.

Notable members 
 Guglielmo Scarampi, Podestà of Genoa in 1264.
Enrico Scarampi , Bishop of Acqui, Bishop of Belluno-Feltre, and participant in the Council of Constance in 1414–1418.
Francesco Scarampi di Moncucco e Monale, Mayor of Turin in 1725
Girolamo Scarampi, Bishop of Campagna from 1571 to 1584
Giuseppe Maria Scarampi, Bishop of Vigevano from 1757 to 1801
Lazzaro Scarampi, Bishop of Como from 1461 to 1466
Ludovico Scarampi Mezzarota (1401–1465), doctor, condottiere and cardinal
Luigi Scarampi del Cairo, Mayor of Turin in 1783
Rolando Scarampi, from the branch of the family who were counts of Camino, and perhaps from Casale, was Bishop of Reggio Emilia from c.1336 to c.1339.
Pierfrancesco Scarampi (1596–1656) a Roman Catholic oratorian and Papal envoy to Confederate Ireland.
Ottavio Maria Scarampi del Cairo (1672–1728), commander of the vessel of the Grand Master of the Sovereign Military Order of Malta and navy captain under Victor Amadeus II
Galeazzo Scarampi del Cairo (1878–1939), officer of the Military Order of Italy and Major general of the Royal Italian Army

The name Scarampi is also used in the toponyms of various places which were fiefs of the family, including Montaldo Scarampi and San Giorgio Scarampi. Several castles are associated with the Scarampi family, including the Castle of  Camino and Castle of Monforte d'Alba.

Notes
This article was originally translated from its counterpart in the Italian Wikipedia.

People from Asti
Italian families
Italian-language surnames
Banking families